Jin Jin and the Panda Patrol is a 1994 animated TV series created by Beijing Golden Panda Animation Company and dubbed by Saban Entertainment. Ownership of the series passed to Disney in 2001 when Disney acquired Fox Kids Worldwide, which also includes Saban Entertainment. The series is not available on Disney+.

Plot
Jin Jin is a panda living in Pandaland. His home ends up destroyed by Grimster, a henchman of the evil Dr. Mania. Dr. Mania plans to regress the Earth back to its primitive times before humans had developed over parts of nature. Now Jin Jin travels to stop the plot of Dr. Maniac, find the New Pandaland, and even save some endangered species along the way.

Characters

 Jin Jin (voiced by Barbara Goodson) – The main protagonist of the series. Jin Jin is a panda from Pandaland whose home ends up destroyed by Grimster and Jin Jin ends up separated from his family. Jin Jin is on a journey to find the New Pandaland while evading the minions of Dr. Mania.
 Rudy Redbone (voiced by Dave Mallow) – A karate dog who befriends Jin Jin.
 Benji – A monkey who befriends Jin Jin.
 Squawk – A parrot who befriends Jin Jin.
 Dr. Mania (voiced by Steve Kramer) – The primary antagonist of the series. He is a mad scientist who plans to regress the Earth back to its primitive times. Due to Jin Jin thwarting his plans, Dr. Mania ends up placing a bounty on Jin Jin in order to get rid of him.
 Grimster – Dr. Mania's henchman, a gorilla who is a bounty hunter.
 Hopper – A "manhopper" that was created by Dr. Mania who used a machine and chemicals on a grasshopper. He is an expert in all the martial arts and the master of every weapon known to mankind.

Voice actors
 Susan Blu
 Steve Bulen – Grimster
 Barbara Goodson – Jin Jin
 Steve Kramer – Dr. Mania
 Dave Mallow – Rudy Redbone, Squawk, Mugsy Wolf
 Michael McConnohie
 Michael Sorich

Crew
 Robert V. Barron – Writer
 Eric S. Rollman – Executive Producer
 Doug Stone – Voice Director, Producer
 David Walsh – ADR Engineer

Episodes
 "Panda-Manium" – When Pandaland ends up accidentally burned to the ground by Grimster, Jin Jin ends up going on a quest to stop Dr. Mania and reunite with his family in the new Pandaland.
 "Un-Bear-Able!" – When fleeing from Grimster and a hunter named Nestor, Jin Jin ends up being saved by Nestor's daughter Chloe.
 "Dog-Gone Fun!" – Dr. Mania offers a reward for the capture of Jin Jin. Bugsy Wolf and Mugsy Wolf end up capturing Jin Jin only for him to be saved by Rudy Redbone. Following the Wolf Brothers failure, Dr. Mania creates Hopper to help capture Jin Jin.
 "Funky Monkey Business" – Jin Jin and Rudy Redbone put on a martial arts show in the city in order to raise money to find Pandaland.
 "All's Well That Ends Up In The Well!" – Jin Jin ends up in a well as a fox named Randall wonders how to get him out so that he can collect his reward from Dr. Mania.
 "Tomb Much to Bear!" – While inside a tomb, Jin Jin ends up pursued by Hopper.
 "No Zoos Is Good Zoos!" –
 "Sand, Sand, Everywhere Sand!" –
 "Going Batty!" –
 "An Extinct Possibility" –
 "I Gotta Chameleon Of Them!" –
 "Accidentally, on Porpoise!" –
 "The Three Faces of Eve-il" –
 "On the Horns of a Dilemma" –
 "All Aboard for Trouble" –
 "Here's Hopping!" –
 "Just Hangin 'Around" –
 "Stuffin' Nonsense" –
 "Bear, Bear, Who's Got the Bear?" –
 "Bearly Visible" –
 "It's in the Bag!" –
 "Two Bears Too Many" –
 "A Trainful of Trouble" –
 "Saved by a Whisker!" –
 "We'll Have a Whale of a Time!" –
 "Home at Last!" –

References

External links
 Jin Jin and the Panda Patrol at Internet Movie Database

1994 American television series debuts
1994 American television series endings
1990s American animated television series
American children's animated television series
Chinese children's animated television series
Australian Broadcasting Corporation original programming
English-language television shows
Television series about pandas
Television series by Saban Entertainment